Karolina Kosińska (born 17 June 1986) is a retired tennis player from Poland.

Kosińska began playing tennis aged seven, her favourite surface was clay. As a professional, her career-high singles ranking was world No. 253, achieved in July 2005, in doubles No. 144 (September 2007).

ITF finals

Singles (6–2)

Doubles (14–16)

References

External links
 
 

1986 births
Living people
Tennis players from Warsaw
Polish female tennis players
20th-century Polish women
21st-century Polish women